The New Zealand national cricket team toured India in the 1988–89 season to play three Test matches and five ODIs. India won the 3-match Test series 2-1 and the 5-match ODI series 4-0 (5th ODI was abandoned without a ball bowled).

Test series

1st Test

2nd Test

3rd Test

One Day Internationals (ODIs)

India won the series 4-0, with one match abandoned.

1st ODI

2nd ODI

3rd ODI

4th ODI

5th ODI

References

External links 
Series Archive at ESPN Cricinfo

Indian cricket seasons from 1970–71 to 1999–2000
International cricket competitions from 1988–89 to 1991
New Zealand cricket tours of India
1988 in Indian cricket
1988 in New Zealand cricket